Richard "Rich" Zober (born 22 February 1966) is a racing driver who competed in various formula racing series.

Racing career
Zober started auto racing in 1995 in the SCCA Formula Continental class. The American driver finished eighteenth in the SCCA National Championship Runoffs. He made his debut in the USF2000 championship in 2000. He competed in four races at Road America and Watkins Glen International. He competed in the American Continental Class for older F2000 cars. Zober scored a total of 23 points which placed him ninth in the championship. He returned the following season for two races at Mid-Ohio Sports Car Course. This time he competed in a new Van Diemen in the National Championship class. During the first race Zober spun after which he retired. He managed to finish the second race as the last car running. The following year the American driver switched to the SCCA Formula Atlantic class driving a Swift 008.a. After two years in the amateur series he made his debut in the pro Atlantic Championship. Zober participated at Circuit Gilles Villeneuve in the C2 class for older Formula Atlantic cars in a Swift 008.a. He finished twelfth overall, second in class. Comprent Motorsports entered Zober the following season in the Atlantics support races at the Grand Prix of Cleveland. Again in the C2 class he achieved his first top-ten finish finishing eighth in the first race. In 2008 and 2009 Zober drove for Polestar Racing Group in the championship class. His best finish was an eleventh place at Lime Rock Park in 2009. Zober drove his first full season in the Atlantic Championship in 2012. After the downfall of Champ Car the series was revived by SCCA Pro Racing for 2012. The driver from Newtown, Pennsylvania achieved four top-ten finishes and was placed eighth in the championship.

Racing record

SCCA National Championship Runoffs

American open–wheel racing results
(key) (Races in bold indicate pole position) (Races in italics indicate fastest lap)

Complete USF2000 National Championship results

Star Mazda Championship

Atlantic Championship

References

1966 births
Atlantic Championship drivers
Living people
Indy Pro 2000 Championship drivers
Racing drivers from Pennsylvania
SCCA National Championship Runoffs participants
U.S. F2000 National Championship drivers